The Manoppello Image is a depiction of the face of Jesus Christ on a cloth (17.5 cm wide and 24 cm high) that is stored in a church in the village of Manoppello, Italy. The church, known as Santuario del Volto Santo, is part of a monastery belonging to Capuchin friars. There have been claims that the cloth is the Veil of Veronica.

Background
According to local tradition, an anonymous pilgrim arrived in Manopello in 1508 with the cloth wrapped in a package. The pilgrim gave the package to Dr. Giacomo Antonio Leonelli, who was sitting on a bench in front of the church. The doctor went into the church and unwrapped the package, discovering the veil. He immediately left the church to find the pilgrim but could not trace him. The veil was owned by the Leonelli family for a century. In 1608, Pancrazio Petrucci, a soldier married to Marzia, a member of the Leonelli family, stole the veil from his father-in-law's house. A few years later, Marzia sold it for 400 scudi to Doctor Donato Antonio De Fabritiis to pay a ransom demand for her husband who was a prisoner in Chieti. The veil was given by De Fabritiis to the Capuchins who currently hold it today. This history has been documented by Father Donato da Bomba in his Relatione historica and is based on research that had been started in 1640.

In 1999, German Jesuit Heinnrich Pfeiffer, Professor of Art History at the Pontifical Gregorian University, announced at a press conference in Rome his discovery of the veil in the church of the Capuchin monastery, where it had been since 1660. Pfeiffer had in fact been promoting this image for many years before.

Pfeiffer claims that the image is the Veil of Veronica. He suggests that it was stolen from the Vatican during rebuilding that took place in 1506, before the Sacking of Rome. He further suggests the cloth was placed over Jesus' face in the tomb and that the image was a byproduct of the forces unleashed during Jesus' resurrection – forces, he  believes, that also formed the image on the Shroud of Turin. Additionally, he has proposed a history of the veil going back to the first century. His narrative, however, is unsupported by evidence. There is no substantiated evidence connecting the cloth with Rome or the crucifixion. However, some have observed bits of glass embedded in the cloth, suggesting a connection between it and its former glass container in St. Peter's, reputed to have been smashed open when the cloth was stolen. Nevertheless, the cloth has received much publicity in recent years and Pope Benedict XVI visited the veil on 1 September 2006.

Likewise, Pfeiffer's claims as to the purported impossibility of painting on byssus cloth have been conclusively debunked. In fact, the 16th century art historian Giorgio Vasari wrote in his book that the German artist Albert Durer was painting in watercolours on byssus silk and sent his portrait as a gift to Raphael in honor of his work from the second edition of the works of Giorgio Vasari La Giuntina.

Origins

The cloth has been claimed to be made of a rare fiber called byssus, which is a natural fiber coming from a bivalve mollusc Pinna nobilis, woven into sea silk, and used by ancient people mainly around the Mediterranean coasts. Paul Badde, the Vatican correspondent for Die Welt, claims this is a kind of fabric which would usually only be found in the graves of Egyptian pharaohs, but byssus fabric (or sea silk) has never been exclusive to ancient Egyptians and was considered a high quality fabric made by the Phoenicians, Greek, the Romans, and also during the Middle Ages by the French, Italians, and even today by Sardinians. However, a sample for the laboratory tests that could confirm this material has never been allowed to be taken, and a recent paper concludes that linen must be regarded as the most probable material.

Most researchers state that, despite fringe claims of divine origins, the face on the veil at Manoppello clearly conforms in appearance to the characteristics of an artificially-made image and that stylistically it is similar to images dating to the late Middle Ages or early Renaissance. During the International Workshop on the Scientific approach to the Acheiropoietos Images, held at the ENEA Research Centre of Frascati in 2010, proponents of the painted image theory said the image (and other related copies) is typical of representations of the human form from a given period, and is imperfectly executed, with numerous stylised features, showing that the artist either did not understand, or did not wish to comply with the basic principles of proportion that apply to realistic renderings of the human form apart from some features, such as the crooked nose, which might show the beaten, bruised and human Christ that people would expect to see in an actual divine image.

A further objection, advanced by Ian Wilson, is that because the image does not bear a familial resemblance to known copies (see above), it cannot be the version of the Veronica that was venerated in the Middle Ages. Paul Badde, journalist for the German newspaper Die Welt, in his 2010 book The Face of God, differs with Wilson's statements, comparing images he claims were made before 1608 of an open-eyed and open-mouthed man just like the Manoppello image.

Urban legend theories
 Fanti and Jaworski claim in a paper that the face on the Manoppello Image has numerous "interesting analogies" (page 1) with the face presented on the Shroud of Turin although "their shapes and sizes are not identical" (page 5). They claim that 3D properties of the Manoppello Image (similar to that of the Shroud, but weaker) have been discovered. They also conclude that the characteristics "speak in favor of the Acheropita image" (on page 1). In other words, the theory of the image being not made by human means, which is in contradiction with the studies by R. Falcinelli who is an expert in photography and claims instead that the Manoppello image is rather a manmade painted artifact that would be reminiscent of existing iconography.

Gian Marco Rinaldi from the Italian Committee for the Investigation of Claims of the Paranormal (CICAP) goes as far as to say that the theory according to which there would not be any trace of pigment on the Manoppello Image is nothing but an "urban legend", which takes its roots from internet sites and blogs as well as from the public statements of religious authorities in Italy and many articles from Paul Badde in Die Welt, all of whom have extrapolated dubiously the works of Donato Vittore and Giulio Fanti.

Fanti, although being pro-authenticity, has never claimed that there weren't any traces of pictural pigments; he only stated in his papers that the manner in which the image was made is not known to him and that the image has not been made by weaving "colored thread". Fanti and his collaborators claimed that certain parts did contain pigments but, when zooming to a certain extent between the fibers, pigments were not found between them but only on the fabric's surface, due to the intrinsic characteristics of the extremely fine byssus fabric. Rinaldi insists upon the fact that Fanti and his associates never said in any paper whatsoever that the Manoppello Image corresponded "exactly" to the Turin Shroud, and that such an extrapolated statement has only been made public by sister Blandine Schlömer, a Trappist nun from Manopello in charge of communicating with the media. Rinaldi shows that Fanti changed his theory many times, claiming pigments were absent, then only visible in particular zones such as the eyes and finally that, yes, it contains pigments but only the manner they were deposited on the byssus is unknown to him. These  never-ending adjustments of the pro-authenticity arguments may have led some to extrapolate to such a degree, according to Rinaldi.

See also
 Acheiropoieta: images "not made by hands"
 Depiction of Jesus
 Relics associated with Jesus
 Shroud of Turin
 Sudarium of Oviedo
 Veil of Veronica

Notes

References
di Lazzaro, P. (ed.), Proceedings of the International Workshop on the Scientific approach to the Acheiropoietos Images, ENEA, 2010,

Further reading
Das Christusbild. Zu Herkunft und Entwicklung in Ost und West. Akten der Kongresse in Würzburg, 16-18. Oktober 2014, und Wien, 17.-18. März 2015, ed. by Karlheinz Dietz et al.(Das Östliche Christentum, Neue Folge, Band 62), Würzburg 2016.  
Sudarium Christi The Face of Christ online audio visual featuring texts by sudarium expert Sr. Blandina Paschalis Schlömer et al.

The Holy Face of Manoppello, Francesco Barbesino published originally in Italtian (Cristianità n. 311, 2002) translation by Raymond Frost, University of San Francisco
Volto Santo di Manoppello, The Holy Face by Juliusz Maszloch.
 (CC-BY-SA licensed on DOAJ)

Relics associated with Jesus